Aundré Bumgardner (born July 5, 1994) is an American politician, a Democrat and formerly a member of the Republican party.

Family and early life
His father is African American and his mother is from Puerto Rico.

Political career

Connecticut House of Representatives
Aundré served as a member of the Connecticut House of Representatives, as a Republican, representing Connecticut's 41st assembly district in the General Assembly. Bumgardner was first elected in 2014 and was defeated in 2016. He was the youngest ever person elected to the House at the age of 20.

Groton Town Council
In 2018, Bumgardner was appointed to a vacant seat on the Groton Town Council.

In 2019, Bumgardner was re-elected to the Groton Town Council.

Party switch
In 2018 Bumgardner announced that he was leaving the Republican Party after the Unite the Right Rally in Charlottesville, Virginia. He said that “It wasn’t even so much the words President Trump used, but more so the inaction coming from the Republican Party, not just at the national level, but to a certain extent the state and local level. Silence is absolute complicity.” As of 2018 he was working as the campaign treasurer for the man who unseated him, Rep. Joe de la Cruz, while completing his college education. Bumgardner is a member of the Democratic Town Committee of Groton.

References

Connecticut Democrats
Connecticut Republicans
Members of the Connecticut House of Representatives
21st-century American politicians
Politicians from New London, Connecticut
American politicians of Puerto Rican descent
Puerto Rican people in Connecticut politics
African-American state legislators in Connecticut
Living people
1994 births
Hispanic and Latino American state legislators in Connecticut
21st-century African-American politicians